The Octopus Flying Club, Inc. is a 501(c)(7) not-for-profit flying club, established on September 27, 1962. It operates a fleet of five aircraft, based at Montgomery County Airpark in Gaithersburg, Maryland and North Perry Airport in Hollywood, Florida.

Membership
Membership is open to any qualified pilot, approved by the club's board of directors. Additionally, a limited membership is available to anyone interested in learning to fly, regardless of pilot qualifications. All members pay an initial membership deposit, and they are considered owners without equity. Monthly dues are collected, which are budgeted to cover the fixed costs of the club. Flight time is charged on an hourly basis, as used.

Fleet
The Club operates five four-place Piper and Socata aircraft. The Socata TB200, Socata TB10, Socata Trinidad TB20, Archer II, and Arrow II are all equipped with Garmin 430 GPS Navigation/Communication units, as well as Garmin 396 GPS units, which include real-time weather reporting.

References

External links 
 

Flying clubs
1962 establishments in Maryland
Gaithersburg, Maryland
Clubs and societies in the United States